Brendan Barden was a Gaelic footballer from County Longford, Ireland. He was part of the Longford team that won a National Football League title in 1966 as captain, an O'Byrne Cup in 1965 and a Leinster Senior Football title in 1968. In 1962 he played on the winning Leinster Railway Cup team. In 1966 he was a Leinster All-Star footballer and won a Cú Chulainn Award.

He won 8 Longford Senior Football Championship titles with his club Clonguish during the 1960s and 1970s.

He is the uncle of Longford footballers Enda Barden, Paul Barden, and David Barden.

References

Further reading

Year of birth missing (living people)
Living people
Clonguish Gaelic footballers
Gaelic football backs
Longford inter-county Gaelic footballers